Karankawa  is the extinct, unclassified language of the Texas coast, where the Karankawa people migrated between the mainland and the barrier islands. It was not closely related to other known languages in the area, many of which are also poorly attested, and may have been a language isolate. A couple hundred words are preserved, collected in 1698, 1720, and 1828; in the 1880s, three lists were collected from non-Karankawa who knew some words.

Karankawa has sometimes been included with neighboring languages in a Coahuiltecan family, but that is now thought to be spurious.

Phonology

Vocabulary
Though only a few hundred words of the Karankawa language are preserved, the following are selected words recorded by Albert Gatschet, a late Victorian anthropologist and linguist, referenced from the last fluent speakers of the language.
 Nāt’sa "one", counted on the right pinky
 Haikia "two" or "second", counted on the right ring finger
 Kaxayi "three", counted on the right middle finger
 Hayo hak(ě)n "four", or "fourth", counted on the right index finger
 Do-aḍ "Four", or "fourth", literally "deer", counted on the right index finger
 Nāt’sa Behema, "five" or "fifth", literally "First Father", counted on the right thumb
 Hayo Haikia, "Six" or "Sixth", literally "Three two", counted on the left pinky
 Haikia Nāt’sa, "Seven" or "Seventh", literally "Second one", counted on left ring finger
 Haikia Behema, "Eight" or "Eighth", literally "Second father", counted on left middle finger
 Haikia Do-aḍ, "Nine" or "Ninth", literally "Second deer", counted on the left index finger
 (Do-aḍ) Habe "Ten" or "Tenth", literally "Ten(th deer)", counted on the left thumb
 Kaup(ě)n "Speak"
 Yamawe "Man"
 Glo-essen/Glos(ě)n "Boy"
 Kaninma "Woman" or "Mother"
 Ka'da "Girl"
 Glle-i "Water"
 Ahayika "Friend"
 Dōwal ""Sun"
 Kiss "Dog"
 Peka "White"
 Pal/Ma "Black"
 Aknamus "Eat"
 Tcha "See"
 Ye "Go" or "Walk"

Swanton (1940)
The following vocabulary list of Karankawa is from John Swanton (1940).

{| class="wikitable sortable" style="font-size: 85%"
! gloss !! Karankawa
|-
| about to || tcápn
|-
| acorn || kalac
|-
| adze || kusila
|-
| affectionate || mutá
|-
| after a while || messús
|-
| all the time || mucawáta
|-
| alligator || hókso
|-
| also || ténno
|-
| always || mucawáta
|-
| and || ténno
|-
| angry, to be very || napé-nai naxerúaxa pára
|-
| arm (forearm) || se-cotan
|-
| arm (upper) || se-imahaha
|-
| arrow || demo
|-
| ashes || ahona
|-
| at present || messús
|-
| ax || kialn
|-
| babe || kwā́n
|-
| bad || tcúta
|-
| ball for musket || kecila-demuks
|-
| barrel || búdel
|-
| basin || koje ön
|-
| beads || kujahin
|-
| beans || kudec
|-
| bear || ǒ's
|-
| beef || didot, tíkĕmai
|-
| behold, to || tcá
|-
| belly || a-luk
|-
| big || kunin
|-
| bird || kúdn
|-
| bird, a common || tekotsen
|-
| biscuit || kuejam
|-
| bison || didot
|-
| black || ma, pál
|-
| blue || tsō'l
|-
| board || kuaham
|-
| boat || awán, elucun
|-
| bow, a || gái, kruin
|-
| bowl || kok
|-
| boy || kolohs, níktam
|-
| bread || kwiáṃ
|-
| bread, fresh || kokam
|-
| break, to || táhama
|-
| breast || kanín
|-
| brush || tesselénia
|-
| bucket of tin || koláme
|-
| build (a fire), to || kosáta
|-
| building || bá-ak, kaham
|-
| bull || didot
|-
| by and by || messús
|-
| cabin || bá-ak, kaham
|-
| calf || koco
|-
| calico || kádla
|-
| calumet || kadiol
|-
| camp || bá-ak, kaham
|-
| can || tá
|-
| cannon || etjam
|-
| canoe || awā́n, elucun, uahahim
|-
| capture, to || haítn
|-
| cask || kaa-konam
|-
| cat || gáta
|-
| catch, to || haítn
|-
| cattle || didot
|-
| cherish, to || ka
|-
| chicken || kúdn, wólya
|-
| chief || hálba
|-
| child || kwā́n
|-
| chin || em-imian hanéna
|-
| cigarette || káhe, swénas
|-
| circular || lá-akum
|-
| cloth || kwíss
|-
| clothing || a-lams
|-
| cold || delin
|-
| come! || éwē
|-
| come, to || gás
|-
| come here! éwē || gás, wána
|-
| come quick! || éwē
|-
| converse, to || kaúpn
|-
| cord || bacina
|-
| com || kwiáṃ
|-
| cow, a || nen, didot
|-
| cowhorn || teke-dolan
|-
| crane || kĕdō'd, koln
|-
| curlew || kwojol
|-
| dangerous || tcúta
|-
| dart || kusila
|-
| day || bákta
|-
| dead || mál
|-
| dear || mutá
|-
| deer || dóatn, tekomandotsen
|-
| deerskin || kesul
|-
| desire, to || tá
|-
| disk-shaped || lá-akum
|-
| do, to || kosáta
|-
| dog || kec
|-
| don’t cry! || ăhămmic
|-
| dress || kádla, kwíss
|-
| drink, to || kouaen
|-
| duck || kue, medá-u
|-
| dugout || awā́n
|-
| eagle || balsehe
|-
| eat, to || aknámas
|-
| egg || dáhome
|-
| eight || haíkia
|-
| exhausted || kwá-al
|-
| eye || em-ikus
|-
| eyebrows || im-lahue
|-
| fabric || kwíss
|-
| fall, to || amóak
|-
| far off || nyá wól
|-
| farewell! || atcáta
|-
| father || béhema
|-
| feathers || hamdolok
|-
| female || nen
|-
| fine || plá
|-
| finger || étsma
|-
| fire || húmhe, kwátci, kwoilesem
|-
| fire-pot || koko
|-
| fire-sticks || akta demaje
|-
| fish || áṃ, kiles
|-
| fish-hook || kusila
|-
| five || nā́tsa
|-
| flagon || kedika
|-
| flour || ámhătn
|-
| fly, a || kamej
|-
| foot || eham, kékeya
|-
| four || hayo
|-
| French, the || kalbasska
|-
| friend || aháyika
|-
| get away! || ăhắmmic
|-
| gimlet || klani
|-
| girl || kā́da
|-
| give, to || báwûs
|-
| glass || kusila
|-
| glassware || kujahin
|-
| globiform || lá-akum
|-
| go, to || gás, yé
|-
| go away! || wána
|-
| going to || tcápn
|-
| gone || budáma
|-
| good || kuìst-baha, plá
|-
| good bye! || atcáta
|-
| goose || lá-ak
|-
| gown || kádla, kwíss
|-
| grass || awátcxol
|-
| great || yá-an
|-
| grindstone || hama
|-
| grow, to || kwā́n
|-
| gun || kisulp
|-
| gunpowder || kalmel
|-
| hair || ekia aikui
|-
| hand || étsma
|-
| handsome || hamála
|-
| harpoon || kusila
|-
| hasten, to || kóta, xankéye
|-
| hat || kalama
|-
| hatchet || matcíta
|-
| hate, to || matákia
|-
| he || tál
|-
| head || en-okea
|-
| healthy || klabán
|-
| heart || láhama
|-
| hen || kúdn, wólya
|-
| hog || tapcewá
|-
| horn of cow || teke-dolan
|-
| horse || kanueüm, kuwáyi
|-
| house || bá-ak, kaham
|-
| hungry || ámel
|-
| hurry, to || kóta, xankéye
|-
| hurt, to || kassítcuwakn
|-
| hush || ăhắmmic
|-
| hut || bá-ak, kaham
|-
| I || náyi
|-
| injure, to || kassítcuwakn
|-
| it || tál
|-
| jug || kahan
|-
| jump, to || éṃ
|-
| kettle || kukujol
|-
| kill, to || ahúk
|-
| kitten || gáta
|-
| knee || en-klas
|-
| knife || bekekomb, kusila, silekáyi
|-
| know, to || kúmna, kwáss
|-
| large || yá-an
|-
| lark || kutsen
|-
| laugh, to || kaíta
|-
| leg || em-anpok
|-
| let us go! || wána
|-
| lie down, to || wú-ak
|-
| little || kwā́n, níktam
|-
| lodge || bá-ak, kaham
|-
| long || wól
|-
| long ago || upāt
|-
| love, to || ka
|-
| maize || kwiáṃ
|-
| make, to || káhawan, kosáta
|-
| man || ahaks, tecoyu, úci, yámawe
|-
| manufacture, to || káhawan
|-
| marry, to || mawída
|-
| mast || kesul
|-
| mat || didaham
|-
| me || náyi
|-
| metal || kusila
|-
| milk || tesnakwáya
|-
| mine || náyi
|-
| molasses || téskaus
|-
| moon || a-uil
|-
| mosquito || gắ
|-
| mother || kanín
|-
| mouth || emi-akwoi
|-
| much || wól
|-
| music || yŏ'ta
|-
| musket-ball || kecila-demuks
|-
| my || náyi
|-
| neck || em-sebek
|-
| needle || aguíya, besehena
|-
| nice || plá
|-
| nine || haíkia
|-
| no! || kóṃ
|-
| nose || em-ai aluak
|-
| not || kóṃ
|-
| now || acáhak
|-
| oak-apple || ēkskitula
|-
| obnoxious || tcúta
|-
| octopus || áṃ
|-
| one || nā́tsa
|-
| oyster || dắ
|-
| paddle || em-luajem
|-
| pail || kok
|-
| pain, to cause || kassítcuwakn
|-
| pan, frying- || koláme
|-
| paper || imetes akuam
|-
| past || budáma
|-
| peas || kudec
|-
| pelican || ōkman
|-
| perform, to || kosáta
|-
| pickax || kialn
|-
| pig || kalbasska, madóna
|-
| pimento || kesesmai
|-
| pin || besehena
|-
| pinnacle || kesesmai
|-
| pipe || kadiol
|-
| pistol || ka ai kuan
|-
| plaice || ampaj
|-
| plate made of tin || kesila-konan
|-
| plenty of || wól
|-
| plover || sebe
|-
| potato || yám
|-
| pound, to || kássig
|-
| powerful || wól
|-
| prairie chicken || kúdn, wólya
|-
| presently || acáhak
|-
| pretty || hamála
|-
| produce, to || káhawan
|-
| push, to || dán
|-
| quick, to come || xankéye
|-
| rain || wí-asn
|-
| read, to || gwá
|-
| red || tamóyika
|-
| return, to || gás
|-
| round || lá-akum
|-
| run, to || xankéye, tólos
|-
| saber || teheye
|-
| sail || a-lams
|-
| salt || dem, ketac
|-
| sand || kohon
|-
| satisfaction, expression of || baa
|-
| say, to || kaúpn
|-
| scat! || ăhămmic
|-
| see, to || tcá
|-
| serpent || aúd
|-
| seven || haíkia, nā́tsa
|-
| sew, to || teksilea
|-
| sexual organs, male || em-ibak
|-
| she || tál
|-
| ship || awā́n, elucun
|-
| shirt || gusgáma
|-
| shoe || kameplan
|-
| shoot, to || ódn
|-
| shoulder || em-sehota
|-
| sick || a-eas, kwátco
|-
| side to side, to pass from || lon
|-
| sit, to || háka
|-
| sit down! || háka
|-
| six || haíkia, háyo
|-
| skin of deer || kesul
|-
| skip, to || éṃ
|-
| sleep, to || ĭṃ, neianana
|-
| small || kwā́n
|-
| smoke || ánawan
|-
| snake || aúd
|-
| soon || messús
|-
| Spaniards || kahamkeami
|-
| speak, to || gaxiamétĕt, kaúpn
|-
| stag || tekomandotsen
|-
| stand, to || yétso
|-
| stomach || a-luk
|-
| strike, to || gá-an
|-
| strong || wól
|-
| suck, to || énno
|-
| sugar || téskaus
|-
| sun || klos, dóowal
|-
| sweet || téskaus
|-
| swim, to || nótawa
|-
| talk, to || kaúpn
|-
| tall || yá-an
|-
| tar || kuja
|-
| tattooings || bacenana
|-
| tear, to || táhama
|-
| teat || kanín
|-
| tell, to || kaúpn
|-
| ten || hábe
|-
| textile || kwíss
|-
| that || tál
|-
| there || nyá
|-
| thigh || em-edal
|-
| thine || áwa
|-
| this || tál
|-
| thou || áwa
|-
| three || kaxáyi
|-
| thy || áwa
|-
| tired || kwá-al
|-
| tobacco || a-kanan, káhe, dé
|-
| tongue || a-lean
|-
| Tonkawa Indian || Tcankáya
|-
| too || ténno
|-
| tooth || dolonakin, é
|-
| tooth-brush || tesselénia
|-
| touch, to || tcaútawal
|-
| tree || akwiní
|-
| turtle, a large green || haítnlokn
|-
| two || haíkia
|-
| understand, to || kúmna
|-
| useful || plá
|-
| vermilion || kadüm
|-
| vessel || awā́n, elucun
|-
| walk, to || shak, yé
|-
| wall || kesul
|-
| want, to || tá
|-
| water || klai, komkom
|-
| water-hen || uapa
|-
| weep, to || owíya
|-
| well || klabán
|-
| where? || mudá
|-
| whiskey || labá-i
|-
| whistle, to || áksōl
|-
| white || péka
|-
| wicked || tcúta
|-
| wide || yá-an
|-
| will || tcápn
|-
| wind || bá, eta
|-
| wine || klebö
|-
| wish, to || tá
|-
| wolf || kec
|-
| woman, a || acade
|-
| wood || kesul
|-
| work, to || takína
|-
| yes || ihié-ă
|-
| yesterday || tuwámka
|-
| yonder || nyá
|-
| you || áwa
|-
| young of an animal || kwā́n
|-
| youngster || níktam
|}

References

 
Extinct languages of North America
Indigenous languages of the North American Plains
Indigenous languages of Texas
Coahuiltecan languages
Language isolates of North America